Timbellus is a genus of sea snails, marine gastropod mollusks in the family Muricidae, the murex snails or rock snails.

Species
Species within the genus Timbellus include:
 
 † Timbellus arenarius (Steuer, 1912) 
 Timbellus atlantideus (Bouchet & Warén, 1985)
† Timbellus barattus (De Gregorio, 1895) 
 Timbellus bednalli (Brazier, 1878)
 Timbellus bilobatus Houart, 2012 
 † Timbellus brevicauda (Hébert, 1849) 
 †Timbellus calvus (Tate, 1888) 
 † Timbellus capitaneus Pacaud, Goret & Ledon, 2017 
 Timbellus corbariae Houart, 2015
 Timbellus crauroptera (Houart, 1991)
 † Timbellus crenulatus (Röding, 1798) 
 † Timbellus danapris Pacaud, 2018 
 † Timbellus detritus (Koenen, 1890) 
 Timbellus emilyae (Espinosa, Ortea & Fernández-Garcés, 2007)
 Timbellus fernandezi (Houart, 2000)
 Timbellus flemingi (Beu, 1967)
 Timbellus fulgens (Houart, 1988)
 Timbellus goniodes Houart & Héros, 2015
 Timbellus guesti (Harasewych & Jensen, 1979)
 Timbellus havanensis (Vokes, 1970)
 † Timbellus kaiparaensis (C. A. Fleming, 1962) 
 †Timbellus laetificus (Finlay, 1930) 
 † Timbellus latifolius (Bellardi, 1872) 
 Timbellus leucas (Locard, 1897)
 Timbellus levii (Houart, 1988)
 Timbellus lightbourni (Harasewych & Jensen, 1979)
 Timbellus marshalli (Houart, 1989)
 † Timbellus micropterus (Deshayes, 1835) 
 † Timbellus moguntiacus (R. Janssen, 1979) 
 Timbellus pannuceus Houart & Héros, 2015
 † Timbellus perlongus (Bellardi, 1873) 
 Timbellus phaneus (Dall, 1889)
 Timbellus phyllopterus (Lamarck, 1822)
 Timbellus priabonicus Pacaud, 2018 
 Timbellus radwini (Harasewych & Jensen, 1979)
 Timbellus richeri (Houart, 1987)
 Timbellus rubidus (Houart, 2001)
 Timbellus stenostoma (Houart, 1991)
 Timbellus sublimis Houart, 2012
 † Timbellus swainsoni (Michelotti, 1841) 
 † Timbellus tripteroides (Lamarck, 1822) 
 Timbellus vespertilio (Kuroda in Kira, 1959)
 † Timbellus waiareka (Beu, 1970)
 Timbellus xenos (Harasewych, 1982)

Species brought into synonymy
 Timbellus concavopterus (Kosuge, 1980): synonym of Favartia concavoptera (Kosuge, 1980) (superseded combination)
 Timbellus miyokoae (Kosuge, 1979): synonym of Chicoreus miyokoae (Kosuge, 1979)

References

 Merle D., Garrigues B. & Pointier J.-P. (2011) Fossil and Recent Muricidae of the world. Part Muricinae. Hackenheim: Conchbooks. 648 pp. page(s): 128

 
Muricinae